The Mistral class is a class of cruise ships, now owned and operated by MSC Cruises and Ambassador Cruise Line.

History
The lead vessel Mistral was originally ordered by Renaissance Cruises in the summer of 1996, but the order was later withdrawn. The yard and bankers together held ownership of the ship through a company called Auxiliaire Maritime. During construction at Chantiers de l'Atlantique, the order was taken over by Festival Cruises, which would be receiving its first new-build vessel. Festival Cruises had an option for two more ships of the enlarged Mistral design, but the company decided not to use the option. Two more Mistral class ships were however built for MSC Cruises as MSC Lirica and MSC Opera.

When Festival Cruises went bankrupt in early 2004, all the company's ships were laid up and subsequently auctioned to other operators; European Stars and European Vision were sold to MSC Cruises and renamed MSC Armonia and MSC Sinfonia respectively, while Mistral was sold to Ibero Cruises and renamed Grand Mistral. In 2013, Grand Mistral exited the Ibero Cruises fleet and was transferred to sister brand Costa Cruises as the Costa neoRiviera. Costa reportedly invested €10 million into transforming the ship to integrate it into its fleet. In 2014, MSC Cruises announced that the four Lirica-class ships would undergo renovation under the "Renaissance Programme".

Costa neoRiviera exited Costa's fleet in 2019 and was transferred to sister brand AIDA Cruises as AIDAmira. She was sold in 2022 to Ambassador Cruise Line, which intends operating her as Ambition from 2023.

Incidents
On 2 June 2019, MSC Opera allided with the quay and struck a river cruise ship moored at the San Basilio Pier in the Giudecca Canal at Venice, Italy. The cause was later found to be technical difficulties with the engines while under tow. She sustained superficial scratches, while the smaller river vessel was more heavily damaged and five people were slightly injured.

On 12 March 2021, MSC Lirica was damaged by a fire amidships, which is believed to have started in a lifeboat; there were no casualties. The area affected (part of the vessel that was added in the 2015 lengthening) was later repaired.

Ships
 AIDAmira (1999–2005 as Mistral, 2005–2013 as Grand Mistral, 2013–2019 as Costa neoRiviera, 2019–2022 operated by AIDA), since January 2022 owned by Ambassador Cruise Line, to enter service in 2023 as Ambition
 MSC Armonia (2001–2003 as European Vision, 2004–present operated by MSC)
 MSC Sinfonia (2002–2003 European Stars, 2005–present operated by MSC)
 MSC Lirica (2003–present), had fire accident in 2021
 MSC Opera (2004–present), served as the flagship of the company until MSC Musica entered service in 2006

References

Sources

External links

MSC Lirica-class Cruise Ship
Ships of MSC Cruises